Spring Valley is an unincorporated community in McKee Township, Adams County, Illinois, United States. Spring Valley is east of Liberty and west of Siloam Springs State Park.

References

Unincorporated communities in Adams County, Illinois
Unincorporated communities in Illinois